Gillard is a British kart manufacturer founded by Tim Gillard to build chassis for 100 cc and 125 cc karts. Gillard have won several European championships in partnership with the Peter de Bruijn's racing team.

The Gillard's most recent success was in the 2005 Karting World Championship where the Gillard-supported PDB team won with British driver Oliver Oakes, and Danish driver Michael Christensen won the European Junior Championship in the same year. Before that Carlo Van Dam and Nick De Bruijn (both Dutch) won the European Formula A Championship in 2001 and 2004 respectively.

In 2010 the Gillard-supported DFK racing team based in Antwerp won the Rotax Eurochallenge with Joey Van Splunteren.

2007 Formula 1 World Champion Kimi Räikkönen was an official driver in 1999 and finished second in the European Formula Super A Championship.

External links
 ABkC How to start karting
 UK Karting - Technical tips, Karting forum, Market place (for buying and selling karts)

Kart manufacturers
Manufacturing companies of the United Kingdom